Senegal is a semi-arid country situated at the western tip of Africa. The following is a list of the dragonflies and damselflies that have been documented in Senegal.  Due to a lack of biological surverys in this area, this list is likely to be incomplete.

Dragonflies & Damselflies
Phylum: Arthropoda 
Class: Insecta
Order: Odonata

Dragonflies are predators. The larvae inhabit water and adults fly near aquatic places. They are diverse in color and shape. There are major 2 types of odonates in the world; they are dragonflies and damselflies. The eyes are closer together in dragonflies, and their wings are held broadly opened from the body. They are robust in nature. In contrast, damselflies are delicately built small odonates, with well separated compound eyes. During rest, they do not expand their wings; the wings are folded over the abdomen or slightly spread.

Damselflies are categorized in to Suborder: Zygoptera; and dragonflies into Suborder: Anisoptera. 106 described species from 11 families can be found in Senegal.

Suborder: Zygoptera - Damselflies 
Damselflies are insects of the suborder Zygoptera in the order Odonata. They are similar to dragonflies, which constitute the other odonatan suborder, Anisoptera, but are smaller, have slimmer bodies, and most species fold the wings along the body when at rest. An ancient group, damselflies have existed since at least the Lower Permian, and are found on every continent except Antarctica.

All damselflies are predatory; both nymphs and adults eat other insects. The nymphs are aquatic, with different species living in a variety of freshwater habitats including acid bogs, ponds, lakes and rivers. The nymphs moult repeatedly, at the last moult climbing out of the water to undergo metamorphosis. The skin splits down the back, they emerge and inflate their wings and abdomen to gain their adult form. Their presence on a body of water indicates that it is relatively unpolluted, but their dependence on freshwater makes them vulnerable to damage to their wetland habitats.

The following 31 Damselfly species have been documented in Senegal

Family: Calopterygidae - Jewelwings

Family: Chlorocyphidae - Jewels

Family: Coenagrionidae - Narrow-winged damselflies

Family: Lestidae - Spreadwings

Family: Platycnemididae - Threadtails

Suborder: Anisoptera - Dragonflies. 
A dragonfly is an insect belonging to the order Odonata, suborder Anisoptera (from Greek ἄνισος anisos "uneven" and πτερόν pteron, "wing", because the hindwing is broader than the forewing). Adult dragonflies are characterized by large multifaceted eyes, two pairs of strong transparent wings, sometimes with coloured patches and an elongated body. Dragonflies can be mistaken for the related group, damselflies (Zygoptera), which are similar in structure, though usually lighter in build; however, the wings of most dragonflies are held flat and away from the body, while damselflies hold the wings folded at rest, along or above the abdomen. Dragonflies are agile fliers, while damselflies have a weaker, fluttery flight. Many dragonflies have brilliant iridescent or metallic colours produced by structural coloration, making them conspicuous in flight. An adult dragonfly eye has nearly 24,000 ommatidia.

Dragonflies are predators, both in their aquatic larval stage, when they are known as nymphs or naiads, and as adults. Several years of their lives are spent as nymphs living in fresh water; the adults may be on the wing for just a few days or weeks. They are fast, agile fliers, sometimes migrating across oceans, and are often found near water.

The following 75 Dragonfly species have been documented in Senegal.

Family: Aeshnidae - Hawkers

Family: Corduliidae - Emeralds

Family: Gomphidae - Club-tail dragonflies

Family: Libellulidae - Skimmers

Family: Lindeniidae -

Family: Macromiidae - Cruisers

See also
List of Odonata species of Britain
List of Odonata species of Ireland
List of Odonata species of India
List of Odonata species of South Africa
List of Odonata species of Taiwan

References

Odonates
Senegal